Clément Robillard (May 31, 1850 – March 20, 1926) was a Canadian politician.

Born in Lavaltrie, near L'Assomption, Canada East, Robillard was elected to the Legislative Assembly of Quebec for Montréal division no. 2 in a 1909 by-election. A Liberal, he was re-elected in the riding of Montréal–Saint-Jacques in 1912 and 1916. He did not run in 1919. He was appointed to the Legislative Council of Quebec for de Lanaudière in 1919.

He died in office in Montreal in 1926.

References

1850 births
1926 deaths
People from Lanaudière
Quebec Liberal Party MLCs
Quebec Liberal Party MNAs